Alexander Ivanovich Guchkov (14 October 1862 – 14 February 1936) was a Russian politician, Chairman of the Third Duma and Minister of War in the Russian Provisional Government.

Early years
Alexander Guchkov was born in Moscow. Unlike most of the conservative politicians of that time, Guchkov did not belong to the Russian nobility. His father, the grandson of a peasant, was a factory owner of some means, whose family came from a stock of Old Believers who had acknowledged the authority of the Russian Orthodox Church while keeping their ancient ritual. His mother was French.

Guchkov studied history and humanities at the Moscow State University, and, after having gone through his military training in a grenadier regiment, left for Germany where he read political economy in Berlin under Schmoller. Academic studies were, however, not suited to his active and adventurous character. He gave them up and started traveling. He rode alone on horseback through Mongolia to western Siberia, and narrowly escaped being slaughtered by a mob.

He became known for his hazardous acts, which also included volunteering for the Boer army in the Second Boer War under General Smuts, where he was wounded and taken prisoner. He also fought numerous duels.

He was elected by the Moscow municipal Duma to be a member of the executive (Uprava), and took active part in the self-government of the city. During the Russo-Japanese War, he served in the Red Cross and in the Municipal Union for the organization of hospitals, and he was left to take care of the Russian wounded after the Battle of Mukden. When the Russian Revolution of 1905 developed, he took part in the meetings of Zemstvo representatives, but did not join the Cadets, whom he considered to be too doctrinaire and cosmopolitan.

Guchkov wanted military reforms, including the transfer of certain controls from the court to the Duma and the government. Under Sergei Witte he was appointed as Minister of Trade and Industry.

In October 1906, Guchkov became the head of the conservative liberal Union of 17 October. He had the hope that the Tsar's government would recognize the necessity of great reforms and work with the moderate liberals of the Zemstvos, while safeguarding the monarchical principle. The Tsar signed the October Manifesto. Pyotr Stolypin was for some time in sympathy with that agenda, and even contemplated the formation of a ministry strengthened by leaders of public opinion, of whom Guchkov, Count Heyden and N. Lvov would have been prominent members. When this project came to grief, Guchkov continued to support Stolypin.

Guchkov was Chairman of the Duma's Committee of Imperial Defence, which had a veto over the military budget. In 1908 he condemned the diplomats' decision not to go in war in 1908, when Austria annexed Bosnia and Hercegovina.

In the third Duma, elected on a restricted franchise, the Octobrists assumed the leading role. After Khomiakov's resignation in 1910, Guchkov was elected speaker. He attacked the "irresponsible influences" at the Russian court and the shortcomings of the Ministry of War in preparing for the inevitable conflict with Germany. As Stolypin became more and more violent and reactionary, the Octobrists lost their standing ground, and Guchkov eventually resigned the presidency of the Duma. He "lost faith in the possibility of peaceful evolution."

Party crisis and World War I

In 1912 the Octobrists were defeated in elections to the fourth Duma, losing over 30 seats. Guchkov in particular was defeated in his constituency in Moscow. The remaining Octobrists in Duma split into two fractions and went into opposition. By 1915 many local party branches and the main party newspaper "Voice of Moscow" ceased to exist.

Guchkov is connected with spreading letters between Tsarina Alexandra and Rasputin. Grigori Rasputin's behavior was discussed in the Fourth Duma, and in March 1913 the Octobrists, led by Guchkov and President of the Duma, commissioned an investigation. Worried with the threat of a scandal, the Tsar asked Rasputin to leave for Siberia. Since Rasputin was attacked in the Duma, the Tsarina Alexandra hated him and suggested to hang Guchkov.

With the outbreak of World War I, Guchkov was put in charge of the Red Cross organization on the German front, and it fell to him to search for the corpse of the unfortunate General of the Second Army, Alexander Samsonov. (Which was eventually repatriated to his wife by the Germans). Guchkov became the head of Military-Industrial Committee, an organization created by industrial magnates in order to supply the army. He became friends with Alexei Polivanov. In June 1915 Vladimir Sukhomlinov left on charges of abuse of power and treason by Guchkov and Grand Duke Nicholas. In July 1915 Guchkov was elected chair of the Central War Industry Committee. In August 1915 Guchkov was among the founders of Progressive Bloc, which demanded for establishing ministerial responsibility before the Duma. Nicholas II constantly refused to satisfy this demand. In October 1915 Guchkov became more revolutionary and involved in the preparations of a coup.

In August 1916 the word revolution was on everybody's lips. On 13 October Guchkov travelled to Kislovodsk because of his health. In December 1916 Guchkov came to the painful conclusion the situation could only improve when the Tsar was replaced. Guchkov reported that members of the Progressive Bloc would consider a coup d'etat to force the government to deal with the Duma.

When the February Revolution of 1917 broke out, Guchkov was prepared in to take charge of the Ministry of War and Navy. Shortly after the Petrograd riots in February 1917, Guchkov, along with Vasily Shulgin, came to the army headquarters near Pskov to persuade the Tsar to abdicate. On 2 March 1917 (Old Style) Nicholas II abdicated. In the evening Guchkov was at once arrested and threatened with execution by the workers.

After revolution

After the February Revolution the Union of 17 October legally ceased to exist. Guchkov held the office of War Minister in the Russian Provisional Government until 29 April. He was forced to resign after public unrest, caused by Milyukov's Note. Along with his fellow Octobrist Mikhail Rodzianko he continued to struggle for establishing of "strong government". He supported Lavr Kornilov and was arrested after the Kornilov Affair, but released the next day.

After the October Revolution Guchkov provided financial support for the White Guard. When the eventual defeat of the White Guard became inevitable, he emigrated, first going to Germany. Guchkov died on 14 February, 1936 in Paris.

Memoirs
 Alexander Ivanovich Guchkov rasskazyvaet—Vospominaniya predsedatelya Gosudarstvennoj dumy i voennogo ministra Vremennogo pravitel'stva, Moscow, TOO Red. zhurnala "Voprosy istorii", 1993, 143p.

Modern perception

Guchkov has become something of a cult figure in recent years: his reputation in Russia has grown after a documentary on the main state channel, which included an interview with then-President Vladimir Putin. In the documentary, Putin revealed that Guchkov had been one of his childhood heroes for the way in which he tried to bring democracy to the country.

Personal life
Guchkov was an active member of the irregular freemasonic lodge, the Grand Orient of Russia's Peoples. Earlier he had been a member of a military masonic lodge.

See also 
 Boer Foreign Volunteers

References

Sources
 Alexander Sergeevich Senin. Alexander Ivanovich Guchkov, Moscow, Skriptoriy, 1996, 263p.
 William Ewing Gleason. Alexander Guchkov and the end of the Russian Empire, Philadelphia, American Philosophical Society, 1983, 90p.

1862 births
1936 deaths
Politicians from Moscow
People from Moskovsky Uyezd
Octobrists
Ministers of the Russian Provisional Government
Chairmen of the State Duma (Russian Empire)
Members of the 3rd State Duma of the Russian Empire
Members of the State Council (Russian Empire)
Russian duellists
Moscow State University alumni
Imperial Moscow University alumni
Boer military personnel of the Second Boer War
Second Boer War prisoners of war held by the United Kingdom
Russian people of World War I
White movement people
Emigrants from the Russian Empire to France
Recipients of the Order of St. Anna, 3rd class